The 2010 Auckland mayoral election, was part of the 2010 New Zealand local elections. It was the first election of a mayor for the enlarged Auckland Council, informally known as the "super-city". The election was won by sitting mayor of Manukau City Len Brown with 48.7% votes, over sitting mayor of Auckland City John Banks with 35.17% and first-time candidate Colin Craig with 8.73%. The sitting mayor of North Shore City Andrew Williams polled fourth and actor/director Simon Prast fifth.

The election occurred on Saturday 9 October 2010, as per the Local Electoral Act 2001. Like the majority of New Zealand mayoral elections, the election was held by postal voting using the first-past-the-post system. It was the largest election of the 2010 local elections, with some 961,536 eligible voters (32.5% of all registered voters nationally) able to vote in the election.

Candidates
Several candidates announced their intentions to run for mayor of Auckland before official nominations opened.
 Manukau City mayor Len Brown announced his candidacy on 30 August 2009.
 Auckland City mayor John Banks announced his candidacy on 10 November 2009. He was later found guilty of filing a false electoral return after the election.
 Actor/director Simon Prast announced his candidacy on 25 June 2010.
Direct democracy campaigner Colin Craig announced his candidacy on 28 June 2010.
North Shore City mayor Andrew Williams announced his candidacy on 10 July 2010.

Nominations opened on 23 July 2010, and closed at 12 noon NZST (UTC+12) on 20 August 2010. At the close of nominations, 23 candidates had put their name forward.

Opinion polls and campaigns

Mike Lee and Stephen Tindall did not stand for mayor (though Lee stood as a councillor) but they were included in several opinion polls on a "what if" basis only.
 
Because Len Brown is generally associated with Labour, and John Banks with National, some analysts remarked that the election was likely to involve more party politics than usual in Auckland.

The two front-running candidates Brown and Banks were estimated to have spent around $1 million each on their campaigns, most from bigger donors. It was commented that the fact that Banks' advertising concentrated too much on the old Auckland City area, missing out other parts of the new council areas, and especially the south, may have played a role in his poorer than expected showing.

Results 

 
 
 
 
 
 
 
 
 
 
 
 

 
 
 
 
 

 

 

 
 
 
a Relative to their percentage win in their respective cities in 2007. 
b Based on 20 August 2010 close of roll figure of 961,536 enrolled electors.

Results (final) 
For final results of the voting, see here.

See also 
 Mayor of Auckland
 Auckland Council
 2010 Auckland local elections

References

External links

John Banks
Len Brown
Colin Craig
Shannon Gillies

Mayoral elections in Auckland
2010 elections in New Zealand
2010s in Auckland
Auckland Council
October 2010 events in New Zealand